Todd DePastino (born in Pittsburgh, Pennsylvania, United States) is an author and history professor.

Biography

Personal life
DePastino and his wife Stephanie live in Pittsburgh with their two children.

Education
Mt. Lebanon High School in Pittsburgh; 
BA in History and Philosophy from Boston College;
MA and Ph.D. in American History from Yale University.

Academic career
DePastino teaches at Penn State Beaver.

Writing career
With the birth of his first daughter in 1996, DePastino became a stay-at-home dad, teaching in the evenings at Penn State Beaver and Waynesburg College while finishing his Ph.D. He then revised his dissertation on the history of homelessness into a book, for which he won a National Endowment for the Humanities Fellowship. The result was Citizen Hobo: How a Century of Homelessness Shaped America (2003).

After editing, annotating, and introducing the lost classic, The Road by Jack London, DePastino plunged into his Bill Mauldin research. Bill Mauldin: A Life Up Front (2008) received strong reviews, was an Eisner Award finalist, and won the Sperber Prize for the best biography of a major media figure. His award-winning double-volume collection of Mauldin's World War II cartoons, Willie & Joe: The WWII Years (2008) was followed in 2011 by Willie & Joe: Back Home, which covers 1945-1946.

Commissioned in Battle: A Combat Infantryman in the Pacific, co-authored by Jay Gruenfled, was released by Hellgate Press in early 2012.

Other work
DePastino is the director of the Pittsburgh-based Veterans Breakfast Club.

Works
 Bill Mauldin: A Life Up Front, W.W. Norton, 320 pp., 92 illus. 
 WILLIE & JOE: THE WWII Years, Fantagraphics Books, 650 pp., 
 Citizen Hobo: How A Century of Homelessness Shaped America, University of Chicago Press, 350 pp., 27 illus., 
 The Road, By Jack London, Rutgers University Press, 168 pp., 48 illus., 
 WILLIE & JOE: Back Home, Fantagraphics Books, 288 pp., 
 Commissioned in Battle: A Combat Infantryman in the Pacific, WWII, With Jay Gruenfeld, Hellgate Press, 2012.

References

External links
The Legacy of Pulitzer-Prize Winning Cartoonist Bill Mauldin: An Interview with Biographer Todd DePastino
The editor of 'Willie & Joe: The World War Two Years' chats about the life of cartoonist Bill Mauldin
DePastino discusses Bill Mauldin: A Life Up Front at the Pritzker Military Museum & Library on May 8, 2008
DePastino at the Abraham Lincoln Book Shop

1966 births
People from Mt. Lebanon, Pennsylvania
Living people
Pennsylvania State University faculty
American non-fiction writers
Morrissey College of Arts & Sciences alumni
Yale Graduate School of Arts and Sciences alumni